"Chapter 2: The Child" is the second episode of the first season of the American streaming television series The Mandalorian. It was written by the series' showrunner Jon Favreau, directed by Rick Famuyiwa, and released on Disney+ on November 15, 2019. The episode stars Pedro Pascal as The Mandalorian, a lone bounty hunter who has retrieved "The Child". The episode was nominated for three Primetime Emmy Awards, winning two of them.

Plot 
While returning to his ship on foot with "the Child" in tow, the Mandalorian is ambushed by a trio of Trandoshan warriors. He disintegrates one attempting to rush and kill the Child, revealing a tracking fob. Upon returning to his ship, he finds a team of Jawas scavenging it for parts. After a short battle, they retreat in their Sandcrawler and stun the Mandalorian unconscious with ion blasts. He returns to his ship, finding it stripped bare and all of his weaponry stolen. With the assistance of Kuiil, he grudgingly bargains with the Jawas to return his ship's parts in return for retrieving the egg of a mudhorn.

The Mandalorian fights the large horned beast, but he is battered and thrown around in the mud, his weapons failing and his armor heavily damaged. As the beast charges to finish the Mandalorian, the Child uses the Force to lift it, allowing the Mandalorian to go for the kill by stabbing it in the neck. He returns with the egg, and the Jawas cut it open and eat its contents. He and Kuiil repair his ship, after which Kuiil turns down the Mandalorian's offer of reward and crewing his ship. After parting as friends, the Mandalorian takes to space and the Child wakes up after exhausting itself using the Force.

Production

Development 
The episode was directed by Rick Famuyiwa, and written by showrunner Jon Favreau.

Casting 
In November 2018, Nick Nolte was cast as Kuiil. Brendan Wayne and Lateef Crowder are credited as stunt doubles for The Mandalorian. Misty Rosas is credited as performance artist for Kuiil. The Jawa elder is played by Stephen Jackson Powers Jr. "The Child" was performed by various puppeteers.

Music 
Ludwig Göransson composed the musical score for the episode. The soundtrack album for the episode was released on November 15, 2019.

Reception

Critical response
"The Child" received critical acclaim. On Rotten Tomatoes, the episode holds an approval rating of 93% with an average rating of 7.5/10, based on 40 reviews. The website's critics consensus reads, "Short, but effective, "The Child" answers few questions, but moves the story along with a beautiful simplicity that is at once satisfying and intriguing."

Chris E. Hayner of the GameSpot described the second episode as "the show we were looking for". Susana Polo of Polygon said the episode "feels like one of Cartoon Networks greatest hits" comparing it to Samurai Jack. Katie Rife of The A.V. Club compared the episode to Lone Wolf and Cub, "Like its Japanese equivalent, "The Child" is committed to its guardian-a commitment that introduces the Force to this corner of the galaxy." Ben Lindbergh of The Ringer questioned the Mandalorian's skill believed being "the best in the parsec, but after getting dunked on repeatedly on Arvala-7, it seems like that endorsement translates to 'the most functional bounty hunter in a limited talent pool'".

Awards

The episode was nominated for three Primetime Emmy Awards: Outstanding Special Visual Effects, Outstanding Single-Camera Picture Editing for a Drama Series, and Outstanding Sound Mixing for a Comedy or Drama Series (Half-Hour) and Animation. The episode won the awards for Outstanding Special Visual Effects and Outstanding Sound Mixing for a Comedy or Drama Series (Half-Hour) and Animation.

References

External links 
 
 

2019 American television episodes
Television shows directed by Rick Famuyiwa
The Mandalorian episodes